The Anglican Diocese of On the Coast (formerly the diocese of Ikale-Ilaje) is one of twelve within the Anglican Province of Ondo, itself one of 14 provinces within the Church of Nigeria: the current bishop is the Rt Rev. Seyi Pirisola.

Pirisola took over from the third bishop of the diocese, Ebunoluwa Ogunele, who died in 2019.

The diocese was established (as Ikale-Ilaje) on 6 February 1995. The pioneer bishop was Joseph Akinyele Omoyajowo, followed by the 2nd bishop Joseph Oluwafemi Arulefela, who was consecrated as Bishop of Ikale-Ilaje on 25 January 1999.

Notes

Church of Nigeria dioceses
Dioceses of the Province of Ondo